Old and New Dreams is the second album by jazz quartet Old and New Dreams. The record features trumpeter Don Cherry, saxophonist Dewey Redman, bassist Charlie Haden and drummer Ed Blackwell, and was recorded in 1979 for the ECM label. It is not to be confused with their 1977 album of the same name for Black Saint.

Reception
The Allmusic review by Scott Yanow calls it "Stirring music in a setting that always brought out the best in each of these musicians". Reviewer Tyran Grillo called the album a "delightful excursion into post-bop outlands that sounds as alive as ever", and wrote: "This is a superb album, and regardless of whether these dreams are old or new, they never seem to fade. What makes it so strong is its careful balance of sidewinding monologues and the sense of direction that a full band sound brings. One craves that sound throughout and the expectation it manifests, so that when it comes in such thick doses, it heightens our involvement in the listening. It acknowledges us."

Track listing
 "Lonely Woman" (Ornette Coleman) - 12:23 
 "Togo" (Ed Blackwell) - 5:41 
 "Guinea" (Don Cherry) - 5:34 
 "Open or Close" (Coleman) - 8:12 
 "Orbit of La-Ba" (Dewey Redman) - 7:29 
 "Song for the Whales" (Charlie Haden) - 7:45
Recorded at Talent Studio in Oslo, Norway in August 1979.

Personnel
Don Cherry - pocket trumpet
Dewey Redman - tenor saxophone, musette
Charlie Haden - bass
Ed Blackwell - drums

References 

ECM Records albums
Old and New Dreams albums
1979 albums
Albums produced by Manfred Eicher